Pompo may refer to:

 an Oscan praenomen (personal name)
 the name of the father and a son of Numa Pompilius (753–673 BC), second king of Rome
 Algernon Heneage (1833–1915), Royal Navy admiral nicknamed "Pompo"
 Alfonso "Pompo" Aguado, a founder of the Venezuelan band Guaco
 Pompo: The Cinéphile, a Japanese manga series